Hydrologic Research Center (HRC), founded in 1993, is a public-benefit non-profit research, technology transfer, and science cooperation and education organization, dedicated to the development of effective and sustainable solutions to global water issues. HRC's purpose is to provide a conduit for academic and other up-to-date research to be made suitable for effective application to field operational problems that involve water management and flood disaster mitigation.
The vision of HRC is to assist in limiting societal vulnerability and preserving resiliency in basic human needs, livelihoods, agriculture, water resources, healthy ecosystems, and natural resources. Around the world flash flooding and flooding are the most common natural disasters and the leading cause of natural disaster fatalities worldwide – 40% of all natural disasters.

HRC partners with local governments in 50 countries (2.2 billion people) and other trusted nongovernmental organizations to promote sustainable programs that include education in flash floods, management of water resources, and the development of Flash Flood Guidance Systems to provide vital early warning of flash floods.

Research Journal 

 Journal of Hydrology , Elsevier
 Hydrology Research ISSN Print: 0029-1277, IWA Publishing
 Journal of the American Water Resources Association Online , John Wiley & Sons, Inc

See also 
 Flash flood
 Hydrology
 Flash Flood Guidance Systems
 Meteorology
 Flash flood watch
 Flash flood warning

References

External links 
 Hydrologic Research Center

Flood control in the United States
Water organizations
Hydrology organizations
Environmental organizations based in California
Environmental research institutes
International environmental organizations
Scientific organizations based in the United States
Non-profit organizations based in San Diego
International water associations